Cameron Harper (born November 19, 2001) is an American professional soccer player who plays as a right-back for Major League Soccer club New York Red Bulls.

Early life
Harper was born and raised in California to Scottish parents.

Professional

Celtic
In September 2018, Harper signed with Scottish Premiership club Celtic after turning down a college scholarship from UCLA. After 13 players were ruled out of the first-team squad due to COVID protocols, Harper made his professional debut, appearing as a starter in a 1–1 draw against Hibernian on January 11, 2021.

New York Red Bulls
On March 5, 2021, it was announced that Harper joined Major League Soccer side New York Red Bulls on a transfer from Celtic. On April 25, 2021, he made his debut for New York, appearing as a second-half substitute in a 3–2 loss to the LA Galaxy.

On May 10, 2022, Harper made his first appearance of the season for New York, providing an assist to Zach Ryan in a 3-0 victory over D.C. United as the club advanced to Round of 16 in the 2022 U.S. Open Cup. A few days later, on May 14, Harper helped New York to a 1-1 draw on the road against Philadelphia Union, assisting Luquinhas on the equalizing goal. Harper started his first match for the club on May 18, 2022, and scored his first professional goal in a 3-3 draw with Chicago Fire SC.  On July 24, 2022, Harper scored and assisted on the winning goal for New York in a 4-3 victory over Austin FC at Q2 Stadium.

International
Harper is eligible to represent the United States and Scotland internationally. In 2019, he was invited to youth national-team camps for both nations, but decided to represent the United States.

Career statistics

Club

References

External links 
 

2001 births
Living people
American people of Scottish descent
American soccer players
United States men's under-20 international soccer players
Association football forwards
Celtic F.C. players
New York Red Bulls players
Scottish Professional Football League players
Soccer players from Sacramento, California
Major League Soccer players